Magalang, officially the Municipality of Magalang, is a 1st class municipality in the province of Pampanga, Philippines. According to the 2020 census, it has a population of 124,188 people.

Magalang is part of the First Congressional District of Pampanga where Angeles City and Mabalacat are also included.

History
Magalang was mentioned as visita of the nearby town of Arayat on December 29, 1598. On April 30, 1605, it was separated by the Augustinians from Arayat and attained township status due to the bajo de la campana system. Augustinians appointed Fr. Gonzalo de Salazar, OSA as the first pastor.

Magalang was initially called Magalo, derived from the Kapampangan word "Galo", which means wavy and moving, describing the dangerous flow of the Parua River.

The town proper was located in Macapsa, but due to the natural calamities and revolts led by Andres Malong and his subordinate Melchor de Vera against the Spanish in 1660, it was nearly abandoned. It was moved to San Bartolome in 1734 until it was swept by the flood due to the overflow of the Parua River in 1863. It was transferred to the present site in barrio San Pedro Talimunduc on December 13, 1863, led by the parish priest, Fr. Ignacio Manzanares, OSA and some of the members of principalia including Pablo M. Luciano, gobernadorcillo of Magalang at that time.

In 1885, the agricultural experiment station La Granja Modelo de Luzon was transferred from San Isidro, Nueva Ecija to the foothills in Mt. Arayat, which become the present Pampanga State Agricultural University.

The revolutionary government took over the local government on June 12, 1898, led by General Francisco Macabulos and Colonel Lorenzo D. Camaya. During that time, Magalang was one of the revolutionary centers in Pampanga due to its proximity to Camansi, a revolutionaries' headquarters located in Mt. Arayat. The forces of Major General Servillano Aquino defended Magalang against Americans until it was successfully captured on November 5, 1899, led by Major General Arthur MacArthur and Colonel Jacob H. Smith. On January 1, 1942, Japanese forces defeated the Filipino-American forces composed of Igorot troops led by Major Helmert Duisterhof and Capt. Russell W. Volckmann, paving the way for the capture of Magalang. It was liberated by the 148th Infantry of 37th Division, US Army with the help of Hukbalahap on January 25, 1945. It was one of the hotbeds of Huk insurgency until the rebellion was crushed in 1954.

On December 28, 1963, Mayor Benedicto T. Dayrit was assassinated by the alleged men of Commander Sumulong during a night ball in the town plaza. In 1968, Mayor Daniel T. Lacson was sworn in as mayor of Magalang until his term ended in 1986.

In December 1993, Mayor Daniel Lacson Jr. was briefly replaced by his political rival Elpidio Lakandula when the latter was declared the victor in the 1992 election by the Angeles City Regional Trial Court on December 28, which was immediately met with protests by Lacson and his followers.

During the tenure of Mayor Pastor Z. Guiao, Magalang was named as one of the cleanest municipalities in the Philippines. Mayor Maria Lourdes P. Lacson was sworn in on June 30, 2016, as the first woman mayor of Magalang.

Geography

Barangays
Magalang is politically subdivided into 27 barangays.

Climate

Demographics

Religion

Roman Catholic 85%; In Magalang were church locales of Members Church of God International or Ang Dating Daan can be found which yields thousands of members. Other major religious groups are Iglesia ni Cristo, Evangelical Christians and others are also established in the municipality.
Aside from Catholic churches, the town has a new United Methodist Church. In the year 1908, Protestantism was introduced and Vicente Naguit was the first convert.

San Bartolome Parish Church 

St. Bartholomew Parish Church (Roman Catholic Archdiocese of San Fernando, Vicariate of St. John the Beloved) was established by the Augustinians on April 30, 1605. The present edifice was constructed in 1866 by Fr. Ramon Sarrionandia, OSA. The 3-aisle church is made of stone and wood. It is 55m. long, 21m. wide and 7m. high. Interplay of arches, as seen on the main entrance, doors and niches, pediments and fenestrations, including those of the bellowers and adjacent convent suggest a touch of baroque.

San Agustin Chapel 
This chapel located in Dapa, San Agustin, Magalang; where the miraculous image of San Agustin is enshrined. During Spanish period, the image was believed to be carved out by a bandit nearby Mt. Arayat. The small image of San Agustin was brought to Dapa, and there, the small image gradually become larger and miraculous. The image itself cured many diseases and granting child, for those couples who are childless. The chapel is open during Fridays and Holy Week.

San Padre Pio Pietrelcina Chapel 
This chapel is located in sitio Mabato-Bato in San Francisco, Magalang. A first class relic composed of hair particles of St. Padre Pio Pietrelcina was enshrined in this chapel last 2017. Devotees of Padre Pio came to this chapel to paid visit, seek his intercession to their different personal intentions. The chapel is open during Thursdays, 8:00am to 7:00pm. A holy mass is to be offer during third Thursday of the month; and the veneration of the relic is followed after the mass.

Lord's Epiphany Parish 
This parish church located in Angeles-Magalang Road, San Francisco, Magalang was established in 1996. A first class relic of St. Francis of Assisi composed of a piece of bone and his staff, was enshrined in the church last 2016. The veneration of the relic is open during Tuesdays. A holy mass is to be offer in that same day in 6:00pm. After the holy mass, the veneration of the relic and anointing of St. Francis' oil is held after the mass.

Sta Clara de Assisi Chapel 
This chapel is located in sitio Tambacan in San Francisco, Magalang. The chapel, where the second class relic of Saint Claire of Assisi is enshrined. The relic is composed of small piece of veil used by the saint. The chapel is open during Thursdays.

Banal a Bunduk, Dalan ning Krus 
This iconic site was born due to the efforts of Soroptimist International of Magalang. The site is located in sitio Orchard, barrio Ayala, Magalang; in the rolling foothills of Mt. Arayat. This site is composed of life sized images of 14 stations of the cross of Christ. It is favorite destination of pilgrims and devotees during Holy Week.

Economy 

Fishpond owners in Pampanga source their fingerlings (tilapia) from producers in this town, it's well known for its confectionaries (sweets) particularly the incomparable pastilla de leche, a popular item for gift-giving and a table dessert on fiestas and social gatherings. The Magalang sweets are distinct in their unique taste because of the quality of the milk from water buffalo (carabao) that feed on green grass growing on the fresh well-irrigated pastureland of the agricultural section of the town. And large amount of land is Corn or Rice Grain.

Government
Like other towns in the Philippines, Magalang is governed by a mayor and vice mayor who are elected to three-year terms. The mayor is the executive head and leads the town's departments in executing the Sangguniang Bayan's ordinances and improving public services. The vice mayor heads a legislative council consisting of councilors, as members.

List of local chief executives
Gobernardorcillos

Capitan Municipales (Regimen Maura)

Manuel C. Gueco (1893-1895)
Teopisto S. Ganzon (1895-1896)
Paulino C. Gueco (1896-1898)

Revolucion

Buenaventura C. Paras (1898)
Ladislao C. Dayrit (1898-1899)

American Regime (Alcalde)

Daniel O. Lacson (1899-1901)

Municipal Presidents

Alcalde (Commonwealth Period)

Dr. Servillano D. Ayuyao (1934-1937)
Jose M. Navarro (1937-1940)

Alcalde (Japanese Government)

Jose M. Navarro (1940-1943)
Atty. Isidoro D. Ayuyao (1943-1945)

Alcalde (Liberation)

Antonio P. Tiglao (1945-1947)

Mayors (Republic of the Philippines)

Infrastructure

Roads
During the visit of the governor in the remote barangay of Turu in Magalang, she announced the concrete pavement of the one kilometer farm to market road in the said village amounting to P6-million.
Magalang – Angeles Road – connecting between Angeles City to Magalang
Magalang - Mabalacat Road. – connecting between Magalang to Mabalacat
Magalang – Arayat – Santa Ana Road – connecting between Magalang to Santa Ana, bypassing Arayat
Magalang – Concepcion Provincial Road (Ninoy Aquino Highway) – provincial road from Magalang, Pampanga to Concepcion, Tarlac
Don Luis Dizon Drive (also known As PAC Rd.) –connecting Magalang Poblacion - AMLHS and PAC

Health care
On January 10, 2012, Governor Lilia Pineda led the inauguration of the P35-million Andres Luciano District Hospital (ALDH) in Barangay San Pablo.

Education

Colleges and universities
Pampanga State Agricultural University (PSAU), San Agustin
Far East College of Information and Technology, San Pedro 1

Secondary schools
Andres M. Luciano High School (formerly Magalang National High School and Balitucan High School Annex), San Pablo

Dolores National High School, Dolores
Ayala High School, Ayala
Balitucan National High School, Balitucan, San Ildefonso
Magalang Highschool, Santa Lucia
Rudolfo V. Feliciano Memorial High School, San Pedro 2

Elementary schools
Magalang Elementary School (Magalang Central School), San Nicolas 1
Bucanan Elementary School, Bucanan
San Miguel Elementary School, San Miguel
San Francisco Elementary School, San Francisco
San Pedro 2 Elementary School, San Pedro 2
San Pablo Elementary, San Pablo
Navaling Elementary School, Navaling
Santa Cruz Elementary School, Santa Cruz
Santa Maria Elementary School, Santa Maria
San Vicente Elementary School, San Vicente
Turu Elementary School, Turu
Balitucan Elementary School, San Ildefonso
Escaler Elementary School, Escaler
Santo Nino Elementary School, Santo Nino
Santo Rosario Elementary School, SantoRosario, Magalang, Pampanga
Cabalantian Elementary School, Santa Lucia
San Roque Elementary School (SRES) - San Roque (Paligi)

Private schools
Christian Vision Academy Foundation (Pampanga), Inc., Sta Lucia
Christian Vision Academy San Isidro Annex, San Isidro
Hillcrest Heights Institute, San Francisco
Magalang Christian Ecumenical School, Santa Cruz
St. Nathanael Academy, San Nicolas 1
Magalang Institute, San Nicolas 2
AYZ Little Saint's School, San Pedro 2
St. Bernice School, Sta Cruz
Golden Vine Center for Childcare and Development, San Nicolas 1
True Light Foundation School, San Pablo
Brighter Years Child Development Center Inc., Santa Cruz
Magalang Christian Ecumenical School, Inc.
Great Shepherd School of Magalang, Inc.

Festivals and Events

Notable personalities
Liza Lorena
Tonton Gutierrez
Mariel Rodriguez
Yeng Guiao
Vivencio Cuyugan
Ed Ocampo
Nancy Roman
Archbishop Oscar V. Cruz
Norman Gonzales

Images

References

External links

Magalang Profile at PhilAtlas.com
magalang-heritage.weebly.com
Magalang Online
[ Philippine Standard Geographic Code]
Philippine Census Information
Local Governance Performance Management System

Municipalities of Pampanga